Michael Walsh (born April 3, 1962) is an American former professional ice hockey player who played in the National Hockey League (NHL). After four seasons playing for Colgate University's men's ice hockey team, Walsh spent the first two seasons of his professional career with Malmö IF in Sweden. Towards the end of the 1985–86 season he returned to North America, playing in two games for the Springfield Indians of the American Hockey League (AHL). Walsh signed a contract in the off-season with Springfield's parent team, the New York Islanders, and played the next four seasons with the organization. He played in 14 games over parts of two NHL seasons with the Islanders. After the 1989–90 season, during which he was a member of Springfield's Calder Cup winning team, Walsh played a season in Italy for SG Cortina. He played two more seasons in the AHL before retiring after the 1992–93 season. Following his playing career Walsh became a head coach, coaching at the Tilton School and currently Proctor Academy.

Career statistics

References

External links

Living people
American men's ice hockey centers
American ice hockey coaches
Colgate Raiders men's ice hockey players
Ice hockey players from New York (state)
Maine Mariners players
Malmö Redhawks players
New York Islanders players
Providence Bruins players
SG Cortina players
Springfield Indians players
1962 births
Undrafted National Hockey League players
Ice hockey coaches from New York (state)